Booton may refer to:

People
Booton (surname)

Places
Booton, Norfolk
Booton, West Virginia

See also
Buton, an island of Indonesia